Pseudochazara lydia is a species of butterfly in the family Nymphalidae. It is confined to Turkey and Asia Minor.

Flight period 
The species is univoltine and is on wing from June to September.

Food plants
Larvae feed on grasses.

Subspecies
Pseudochazara lydia lydia Bilecik, Eskişehir, Manisa, Bursa (Uludağ - Soğukpinar), Afyon (Sultan Dağlari), Konya (Akşehir) - Turkey
Pseudochazara lydia aurora Eckweiler & Rose, 1989 Antalya, Burdur, Denizli, Isparta, Muğla - Turkey
Pseudochazara lydia obscura (Staudinger, 1878) Içel (Tekir, Elmah, Boğazi), Antalya (Akseki & Irmasan Geçidi), Konya, Adana (N Saimbeyli) - Turkey
Pseudochazara lydia neglecta (Gross, 1978) - Turkey;
Pseudochazara lydia nesrin (Koçak, 1989) - Turkey.

References

External links 
 Satyrinae of the Western Palearctic - Pseudochazara lydia

Pseudochazara
Butterflies described in 1878
Endemic fauna of Turkey
Butterflies of Asia
Taxa named by Otto Staudinger